The following lists events that happened during 2002 in Cape Verde.

Incumbents
President: Pedro Pires
Prime Minister: José Maria Neves

Events
Cape Verde ratified two UN protocols, the Optional Protocol to the Convention on the Rights of the Child on the Involvement of Children in Armed Conflict and the Optional Protocol to the Convention on the Rights of the Child on the Sale of Children, Child Prostitution and Child Pornography
December: The government prohibited the killing of turtles by law, per their participation in the Convention on Biological Diversity in 1995 and the Convention on International Trade in Endangered Species of Wild Fauna and Flora (CITES).

Sports
Sporting Praia won the Cape Verdean Football Championship

References

 
Years of the 21st century in Cape Verde
2000s in Cape Verde
Cape Verde
Cape Verde